Cosimo Fini (born 25 December 1980), better known by the stage name Gué previously as Gué Pequeno, is an Italian rapper and record producer. He was also earlier a member of various formations, notably the hip hop duo Club Dogo with rapper Jake La Furia and producer Don Joe. Between 1999 and 2001, he was also in "Sacre Scuole", a group made up by Gué Pequeno, Dargen D'Amico and Jake La Furia.

Solo career

Beginnings
With the initial pseudonyms of "Lucky Luciano" and "Il Guercio" (The One-eyed), the rapper started his musical career around 1997, when he met Jake La Furia. The friendship between the two leads to the creation of "Sacre Scuole", to which is added Dargen D'Amico, the latter previously classmate of Pequeno. Meanwhile, beatmaker Don Joe becomes their close collaborator. The trio released the 3 MC's al Cubo mixtape, and then disbanded due to contrasts between D'Amico and La Furia. This will lead to D'Amico leaving, and the remaining members, together with Don Joe, will subsequently give birth to Club Dogo.

Pequeno also took part in the production of several albums and mixtapes in those years, including 50 Emcee's Pt. 1 by ATPC and Tutti x uno by DJ Enzo.

Early solo career (2005–2010)
In 2005 Gué Pequeno released the EP Hashishinz Sound Vol. 1 together with the Italian-Angolan producer Deleterio, nowadays known as Del, while the following year he published the Fastlife Mixtape Vol. 1, recorded with DJ Harsh. Three years later, he released the sequel, Fastlife Mixtape Vol. 2: Faster Life.

Over the years he has collaborated with the major artists of the underground and non-underground scene, including Noyz Narcos from TruceKlan, J-Ax, Marracash and Entics. In 2010 he published the book La legge del cane (The Law of the Dog), written together with Jake La Furia. In March 2011, he aired on Deejay TV with the program "Un giorno da cani" (Dogs days), a four-part television format where he and Jake La Furia turn working experiences into lyrics for their songs.

Il ragazzo d'oro and Bravo ragazzo (2010–2014)
In June 2011, his first solo album was released, entitled Il ragazzo d'oro (The Golden Boy), which had the participation of several Italian rappers, including Marracash, Entics, Ensi and Jake La Furia. The disc was anticipated by the singles "Non lo spegnere" (Do not turn it off) and subsequently the video clip for the song "Ultimi Giorni" (Last days).

Also in 2011, the rapper together with DJ Harsh founded the independent record label "Tanta Roba", whose first product was Il mio primo disco da venduto (My first sellout record), by Fedez. Fastlife Mixtape Vol. 3 was also released on 20 January 2012, the result of collaboration with DJ Harsh and other Italian artists of the genre such as the aforementioned Fedez, Emis Killa, Salmo, Gemitaiz and Daniele Vit.

On 28 March 2013, the mixtape Guengsta Rap was released for free download from its official website. The tracks on the album are mixed by DJ Jay-K. On April 5 Gué releases "Business", which is the first single from the second studio album and produced by 2nd Roof. Its video clip is anticipated by a teaser in which it's found out the release date, set for June 4., instead it is published on April 9. Subsequently the second single "Rose Nere" (Black Roses) is announced, released on iTunes on April 23; instead, the video clip was published on YouTube on April 26, the date on which the album title, Bravo ragazzo (Good Boy), was revealed. On 9 May he announced the track list of the album through his Facebook page, while the following day he released the third single extracted from the album, named "Bravo ragazzo" like the album itself.
On June 13, Gué released a preview of the video clip of the song "Il drink & la jolla", made with the participation of 'Ntò and British singer Arlissa. The video was published two days later. On September 12 the video clip of the song Brivido was announced, made together with Marracash and published on September 17. In June 2014, Bravo ragazzo was certified platinum for the average 50,000 copies sold.

Vero (2015)
In the spring of 2015 Pequeno renewed his contract with Universal Music Group and signed the signature for Def Jam Recordings, thus becoming the first Italian artist to sign for the label. Following this, the rapper released the video clip of an unreleased track, named "Squalo". 
The latter, together with the singles "Le bimbe piangono" and "Interstellar", anticipated the release of the rapper's third solo album, entitled True and released on June 23 of the same year.

Collaboration with Marracash (2016–2017)
On 4 January 2016, through social networks, the rapper announced the creation of an album in the studio together with Marracash. Released on June 24 of the same year, the album is titled Santeria and consists of fifteen tracks, including the single forerunner "Nulla Accade", released on June 7.

Gentleman and Sinatra (2017–2020)
On 21 April 2017, Gué Pequeno published the single "Trinità" for digital download and streaming, promoted by the related video clip directed by Igor Grbesic and Marc Lucas. To follow was the double single "Non ci tu tu" / "T'apposto", released on June 2 of the same year.

On June 6, the rapper officially announced the fourth solo album Gentleman, released in the same month and composed of several songs in collaboration with various artists, including Sfera Ebbasta and Marracash. On 1 August 2018 he officially announced his entry into the Billion Headz Music Group, a label founded by Sfera Ebbasta and Charlie Charles. On the 24th of the same month, he announced the release of its fifth solo album Sinatra
through its official social networks, which took place on the following 14 September and anticipated by the single "Trap Phone". The album was later also promoted by the subsequent single "Bling Bling" (Gold) and "2%", both of moderate commercial success.

Mr. Fini and Fastlife 4 (2020–2021)
On 14 June 2020 Gué Pequeno announced the seventh album Mr. Fini, which he defined as his "colossal" and he then released on the 26th of the same month. The singles Saigon and Chico were drawn from it, the latter of which reached the fifth position of the Top Singles. Subsequently it was extracted as a single even 25 hours, for the occasion in a remixed version by Shablo and which saw the vocal participation of Ernia. In the same year he collaborated with Anna on the release of the single Bla Bla, released in October. In December 2020 the rapper released the unreleased Freestyle Fast Life, produced by DJ Harsh.

On 26 March 2021, the rapper re-released his debut album The Golden Boy on the occasion of the tenth anniversary of its release. In addition to the songs from the original edition, present here in a remastered version, there are also unreleased remixes made by various artists belonging to the Italian hip hop scene such as Charlie Charles, Gemitaiz and Lazza. Fastlife 4 mixtape would be released on 9 April 2021, continuing the mixtape series started in 2006 with DJ Harsh.

Name change from "Gué Pequeno" to "Gué" (2021–present)
On 14 November 2021, the Italian rapper revealed the change of pseudonym from Gué Pequeno to Gué, announcing his seventh album (Guesus, sometimes stylized as GVESVS) in the following weeks.

Discography

Studio albums

Live albums

Vinyl compilations

Mixtapes

Extended plays

Singles

As lead artist

As featured artist

Other selected charted songs

Guest appearances

References

External links
Official website

Italian rappers
1980 births
Living people
Musicians from Milan
Rappers from Milan